Georgy de Davydov (born 25 March 1874, date of death unknown) was a sports shooter from the Russian Empire. He competed in four events at the 1912 Summer Olympics.

References

1874 births
Year of death missing
Male sport shooters from the Russian Empire
Olympic competitors for the Russian Empire
Shooters at the 1912 Summer Olympics
Sportspeople from Chișinău